Alberto Rivera Pizarro (born 16 February 1978) is a Spanish retired footballer who played as a central midfielder.

He started out at Real Madrid, but played almost exclusively for its reserve teams during his spell. In a professional career that spanned nearly two decades, he went on to amass La Liga totals of 282 matches and ten goals over 12 seasons, also representing in the competition Numancia, Levante, Betis, Sporting de Gijón and Elche.

Club career

Real Madrid
Rivera was born in Puertollano, Ciudad Real, Castilla–La Mancha. A product of Real Madrid's youth academy, he made his first-team debut aged only 17 (his only appearance for the main squad during 1994–95), scoring in a 2–0 away win against RC Celta de Vigo with the La Liga title race already decided in their favour while becoming the youngest player to score in an official match in the club's history at the age of 17 years and 114 days. He started his senior career with the C team in the Segunda División B, playing two additional full seasons with Real Madrid Castilla in the same level and appearing in five Segunda División games with the latter.

For 1999–2000, Rivera signed with CD Numancia in a loan deal. After helping the Soria side barely avoid top-division relegation he returned to Real Madrid, where he was featured in two additional league games the following season; in January 2002 he had another loan spell, with Ligue 1 side Olympique de Marseille to where he moved alongside Alfonso Pérez from FC Barcelona, and appeared regularly for the French team until the end of the campaign, in an eventual ninth-place finish.

Levante and Betis
Rivera joined Levante UD in 2002, with the team in the second division. He was an undisputed starter in three seasons, netting a career-high 11 goals in 2003–04's promotion before moving on to Real Betis upon Levante's immediate relegation (having played all the matches but one, with five goals), for €3.4 million.

Rivera made 34 league appearances in 2005–06, adding seven in the UEFA Champions League and three in the UEFA Cup, without finding the net however. The following campaign he played 27 times, scoring his first goal in a 3–2 defeat at Villarreal CF on 5 November 2006.

Sporting
In mid-June 2009, after rejecting Betis' offer of a new deal, and with the Andalusians having been relegated, Rivera signed a one-year contract with fellow top-tier club Sporting de Gijón – with the option for a further two – which had barely retained its status, arriving on a free transfer and reuniting with former Levante boss Manolo Preciado. At the end of his second season, he received the Fair Play Award given by the Professional Football League.

Rivera appeared in an average of 31 games during his spell in Asturias, suffering top-flight relegation in his third and final year. He retired in summer 2014 at the age of 36 after two seasons with Elche CF, the latter spent in the main division.

Honours
Real Madrid
La Liga: 1994–95, 2000–01

Levante
Segunda División: 2003–04

Elche
Segunda División: 2012–13

References

External links

1978 births
Living people
People from Puertollano
Sportspeople from the Province of Ciudad Real
Spanish footballers
Footballers from Castilla–La Mancha
Association football midfielders
La Liga players
Segunda División players
Segunda División B players
Real Madrid C footballers
Real Madrid CF players
Real Madrid Castilla footballers
CD Numancia players
Levante UD footballers
Real Betis players
Sporting de Gijón players
Elche CF players
Ligue 1 players
Olympique de Marseille players
Spain youth international footballers
Spanish expatriate footballers
Expatriate footballers in France
Spanish expatriate sportspeople in France